Escape on Venus is a science fantasy novel by American writer  Edgar Rice Burroughs, the fourth book in the Venus series (Sometimes called the "Carson Napier of Venus series"). It consists of four interconnected stories published in Fantastic Adventures between 1941 and 1942: "Slaves of the Fish Men", "Goddess of Fire", "The Living Dead," and "War on Venus". A collected edition of these stories was published in 1946.

Copyright
The copyright for this story has expired in Australia, and thus now resides in the public domain there.  The text is available via Project Gutenberg Australia.

Original stories
"Slaves of the Fish Men", March 1941
"Goddess of Fire", July 1941
"The Living Dead", November 1941
"War on Venus", March 1942

External links
 
ERBzine C.H.A.S.E.R ENCYCLOPEDIA entry for Escape on Venus
Free Ebook from Project Gutenberg of Australia
Edgar Rice Burroughs Summary Project page for Escape on Venus

1946 short story collections
1946 fantasy novels
1946 science fiction novels
American fantasy novels
American science fiction novels
Fantasy short story collections
Science fiction short story collections
Short story collections by Edgar Rice Burroughs
Venus novels by Edgar Rice Burroughs